The Voice Kids is a French music talent show for aspiring singers aged 6 to 15, based on the concept of the show The Voice: la plus belle voix. The first broadcast took place on 23 August 2014 on TF1. Unlike the adult version, during seasons 1 to 4, there were only three coaches. From season 5 onward, a fourth coach was added, following the adaptation of the original Dutch version.

So far there have been eight winners: Carla Georges, Jane Constance, Manuela Diaz, Angélina Nava, Emma Cerchi, Soan Arhimann, Rébecca Sayaque, and Raynaud Sadon.

Coaches and presenters

Coaches and finalists 
  Winner
  Runner-up
  Third place
  Fourth place
  Semi-finalists

Series overview
Warning: the following table presents a significant amount of different colors.

References

External links 
 

2014 French television series debuts
2010s French television series
French television series based on non-French television series
Television series about children
Television series about teenagers